Maksim Pavlovich Bachinsky (born 2 February 2000) is a Russian football player. He plays for FC Leningradets Leningrad Oblast.

Club career
He made his debut in the Russian Football National League for FC Zenit-2 Saint Petersburg on 17 July 2018 in a game against FC Tambov.

References

External links
 Profile by Russian Football National League

2000 births
People from Baltiysk
Living people
Russian footballers
FC Zenit-2 Saint Petersburg players
FC Tekstilshchik Ivanovo players
Association football forwards
Russian First League players
Russian Second League players
FC Zenit Saint Petersburg players
FC Leningradets Leningrad Oblast players
Sportspeople from Kaliningrad Oblast